A permanent downhole gauge (PDG) is a pressure and/or temperature gauge permanently installed in an oil or gas well. Typically they are installed in tubing in the well and can measure the tubing pressure or annulus pressure or both. Systems installed in well casing to read formation pressure directly, suspended systems, and systems built in coil (continuous) tubing are also available. The data that PDGs provide are useful to Reservoir Engineers in determining the quantities of oil or gas contained below the Earth's surface in an oil or gas reservoir and also which method of production is best.

Permanent downhole gauges – are installed in oil and gas wells for the purposes of observation and optimization. The most prolific function of a downhole gauge is to monitor pressure at a single point or multiple points in a well. Temperature is the second most monitored factor. Permanent downhole gauges continue to evolve into many different types of sensors.

 pressure
 temperature
 distributive temperature
 noise
 strain
 flow

The information provided by a permanently mounted sensor enables smart well technology. A "smart well" is a well that can monitor information and make adjustments automatically. The adjustments will optimize production or protect the well. The vast majority of producing oil and gas wells in the world have no such instrumentation or capabilities. PDG's are important tools for optimal production and protection of our most important non-renewable resources.

External links
Active Completions – The history and evolution of downhole permanent reservoir monitoring systems
Measuring instruments